Ivan Galić (born 9 January 1995) is a Croatian footballer who plays for amateur side NK Graničar Slavonski Šamac.

Club career
Galić started off at a lower-tier club in Slavonski Šamac, moving on to NK Slavonac CO. At the age of 14, he moved to Zagreb and joined NK Trnje. A year after, he joined the NK Lokomotiva academy. At 18 years of age, he joined NK Rudeš for half a season, making his first senior appearances in the Druga HNL, before returning to NK Lokomotiva.

In June 2014, he signed a three-year contract with NK Istra 1961. After spending the first half of the season playing for the third-tier reserve team, Galić moved on to another third-tier team, NK Vrapče, where he played as a right back. Subsequently, Galić moved back to Druga HNL to NK Lučko, but his stay at the club echoed the previous ones, lasting for half a season before he moved abroad for the first time – to FK Rabotnički.

In the summer of 2016, he moved to Albania, signing a contract with Flamurtari Vlorë.

References

External links

1995 births
Living people
Sportspeople from Slavonski Brod
Association football wingers
Croatian footballers
NK Rudeš players
NK Istra 1961 players
NK Vrapče players
NK Lučko players
FK Rabotnički players
Flamurtari Vlorë players
HNK Cibalia players
KF Laçi players
Croatian Football League players
First Football League (Croatia) players
Macedonian First Football League players
Kategoria Superiore players
Croatian expatriate footballers
Expatriate footballers in North Macedonia
Croatian expatriate sportspeople in North Macedonia
Expatriate footballers in Albania
Croatian expatriate sportspeople in Albania